Eupithecia duplex is a moth in the family Geometridae. It is found in China.

References

Moths described in 1931
duplex
Moths of Asia